Jackie Lane may refer to:

Jackie Lane (actress) (1941–2021), British actress
Jackie Lane (footballer) (born 1931), English former footballer
Jocelyn Lane (born 1937), model, actress and designer also known as Jackie Lane

See also
John Lane (disambiguation)